Patrick Brady may refer to:

Patrick H. Brady (Navy) (born 1959), U.S. Navy Rear Admiral, submarine commander
Patrick Henry Brady (born 1936), U.S. Army Major General and Medal of Honor recipient
P. J. Brady (1868–1943), Irish nationalist MP in the United Kingdom Parliament for Dublin St Stephen's Green 
Patrick Jennings Brady (born 1967), American artist